Opsomeigenia is a genus of parasitic flies in the family Tachinidae.

Species
Opsomeigenia aegrota (Wulp, 1890)
Opsomeigenia flavipalpis (Reinhard, 1934)
Opsomeigenia orientalis Yang, 1989
Opsomeigenia pusilla (Coquillett, 1895)

References

Diptera of Asia
Diptera of North America
Exoristinae
Tachinidae genera
Taxa named by Charles Henry Tyler Townsend